The Sasquatch Gang (also known as The Sasquatch Dumpling Gang) is a 2006 comedy film written and directed by Tim Skousen, the first assistant director on Napoleon Dynamite.

The six-week shoot was completed in the summer of 2005. The film premiered in January 2006 at the Slamdance Film Festival, where it won the Audience Award.  It was also shown at the HBO US Comedy Arts Festival in Aspen, picking up 2 awards.  One for Justin Long for Best Actor and Tim Skousen Best Director.  It also showed at the Waterfront Film Festival, New Zealand Film Festival, Sidewalk Film Festival, and Vail Film Festival. The film opened in limited release in the United States on November 30, 2007. The film was released on DVD on March 25, 2008.

With a production budget of 1.6 million USD, the film's return from box office sales were a domestic gross of $9,458 USD. The film had a limited cinema run with only 9 opening theaters and an average 1 week run at each theatre.

Plot
Zerk is a young jobless man who is in debt to a collection agency for a credit card transaction at a burger place in 1999. A collection agency rep is sent to warn him that he has 10 days to pay his debt, or else his car will be repossessed; because he had been ignoring the bank's calls. Zerk must find a way to  quickly earn enough to save his car. He robs a video rental store and buys beers with the money, instead. The next day, he has a hangover. He can't stand the music his neighbors play. He decides to fight them. After he beats down Hobie, a fat boy in the neighborhood to the ground, he hears them talking about the sasquatch, a legend that this small town believes. Zerk has a great idea: He'll buy ingredients to prepare a fake sasquatch feces. His friend Shirts helps him and they leave the tracks in the forest Hobie and his friends are about to visit. Hobie falls onto the fake feces and they "discover" the sasquatch's feces. Zerk and Shirts are behind a tree, watching. Later Hobie and his friends meet Shane, a long-time bully. He starts to make fun of the braces of Sophie, Hobie's friend. Actually she had her mouth wired by her dentist uncle, so as to lose weight. Sophie, not seeming afraid, tells Shane "How about I kick you in the balls?" This refers to the night Sophie was with Gavin, Hobie's best friend, when Shane tried to kiss Sophie by force, without Gavin realizing it. Hobie saw it, though. He went to the place where Shane and his friends left, and took the money they forgot. With it, he bought a small toy for Sophie.

Actually, Sophie was working at a video rental store which Zerk would rob, and Hobie went there in order to give the toy. He thought she might be interested in him so he told her he's into fantastic movies. Sophie doesn't seem interested, so Hobie, heartbroken, leaves the bookshop and that's exactly when Zerk enters. In the next scene, Zerk and Shirts are seen, leaving the tracks into the forest.

Sophie, meeting Gavin earlier than Hobie, is only interested in him, so they go to a date. They go against Shane's gang in a game. Hobie, maddened over the fact that he feels like the third wheel to the newly-blossoming couple, shoots his teammate, Sophie. Sophie needs to leave the game. Some time later, it's only Gavin against Shane. Since he's a long-time lover of fantasy like Sophie, he remembers Perseus' trick and uses it over Shane. He wins. Shane bullies him verbally again and leaves the scene. The three friends celebrate the victory. After a fun night, they find Gavin's car ruined by Shane and his gang. He'd written "Fat Sophie" onto the car, so she leaves the scene, heartbroken. Hobie tells Gavin "It's all your fault, you should've let me stay because I know I'd be the third wheel."

Sophie now doesn't want to see Gavin. Hobie is still mad at Gavin, too. Gavin falls off his bike and this is seen by Zerk. This time, he decides not to give him a beatdown, instead, he gives him a motivational speech like a big brother.

The whole town has been waiting for Doctor to tell if the sasquatch feces is genuine, or not. He finally arrives. They, altogether, go to the forest. Now, Zerk is panicked. He needs to destroy evidence. He arrives at the scene, finding the fake evidence destroyed already. It'd been Hobie, anyway. Because he had been jealous of Gavin, stealing his potential love-interest, ignoring Hobie lately, etc.

Zerk hides behind the same tree, and his noise is heard by the police, who happens to be Shane's uncle. He arrests Zerk for creating fake evidence for the polices, and Doctor leaves the scene; but Gavin and Sophie are busy, talking. So, they don't realize Shane and his gang are still there, too. Shane pushes Sophie, she hits her head, and she faints. Gavin is really angry and finds a woodstick to attack Shane, over Zerk's motivational speech. Shane is no afraid. He starts to give Gavin a serious beatdown with his gang but Hobie is there on time. He can't turn his back to his best friend, any more. He takes Shane's friends, it's Shane against Gavin again. Maynard returns to the forest to say something, sees his friends Hobie and Gavin in a bad situation, he runs back to call the police for help. In the meanwhile, Shane's gang decides to run away from Hobie, on the road they see the police coming, they call out Shane's name, Shane's now afraid, leaves the scene and it's Gavin's victory. Sophie isn't awake still, so Gavin decides to kiss her before the police arrives. She does wake up.

The police asks Maynard about the scene, Hobie admits that he knocked off his nephew. The police accepts that he's been a brat, and he'll talk to him. By the way, Gavin points to the hair of Hobie, the police asks what it's about. Gavin says that "It'd been Hobie that fell onto the feces in the first place, so you can find the evidence you're looking for in Hobie's hair." Doctor does find some "feces" in Hobie's hair, so he declares it's genuine sasquatch dumpling.

Sophie is then seen without the wires in her mouth, she decided to love herself the way she is. Gavin happily kisses her, Hobie and Maynard start roleplaying as Arthur's knights. Zerk is freed from jail, because the town now believes the sasquatch is real, so he does not have to stay in jail. Zerk is welcomed by Shirts, and the first question he asks is about the money. Shirts tells him that "Our fake sasquatch dumplings are sold for real, but since more people believe the sasquatches exist now, everyone started to sell fake dumplings." Zerk understands that all his "hard work" has been in vain, tries not to cry, and asks Shirts what to do next. One final suggestion by Shirts is that: Zerk joins the car races. If he loses his car in the races, there'll be no car to take from Zerk by the bank's force. If he wins the races, he can pay his debt to the bank. Zerk is overjoyed by this idea, but the movie returns to its very first scene: The red car of Zerk's has a small accident, meaning he's left with no car to give to the bank.

Cast
 Jeremy Sumpter as Gavin Gore
 Justin Long as Ezekiel "Zerk" Wilder
 Joey Kern as Lance "Shirts" Jokum
 Addie Land as Sophie Suchowski
 Hubbel Palmer as Hobie Plumber
 Rob Pinkston as Maynard Keyes
 Michael Mitchell as Shane Bagwell
 Ray Santiago as Crone
 Jeff D'Agostino as Dagan
 Jon Gries as Sheriff Ed Chillcut
 Carl Weathers as Dr. Artimus Snodgrass
 Stephen Tobolowsky as Ernie Dalrymple
 Jon Heder as Laser tag referee
 Lucas Adams as Kid with Dreadlocks (extra)

References

https://www.imdb.com/title/tt0460925/

External links
 
 
 
 
 

2006 films
2006 comedy films
2000s teen comedy films
American teen comedy films
Bigfoot films
Films scored by John Swihart
Films shot in Oregon
Publicity stunts in fiction
2000s English-language films
2000s American films